Events from the year 2019 in the Netherlands.

Incumbents
 Monarch: Willem-Alexander
 Prime Minister: Mark Rutte (VVD)
 Speaker of the House of Representatives: Khadija Arib (PvdA)
 President of the Senate: Jan Anthonie Bruijn (VVD)

Events 
 1 January –
 A celebratory fire on the beach in Scheveningen caused a spark rain over the surrounding neighbourhood, setting multiple buildings on fire
 Arthur van Dijk (VVD) is sworn in as the King's Commissioner of North Holland
 1 February –
 Hans Oosters (PvdA) becomes the King's Commissioner of Utrecht
 Pieter-Jaap Aalbersberg is appointed Nationaal Coördinator Terrorismebestrijding en Veiligheid (NCTV)
 6 February – John Berends (CDA) takes over as the King's Commissioner of Gelderland
 18 March – Three people are killed and seven others are injured in the 2019 Utrecht shooting
 20 March – 2019 provincial elections
 18 May – Duncan Laurence wins the Eurovision Song Contest 2019; the Netherlands' first victory since 1975 
 23 May – 2019 European Parliament election in the Netherlands
 27 May – 2019 Senate election
 11 June – Ankie Broekers-Knol (VVD) is appointed State Secretary for Justice and Security following the resignation of Mark Harbers
 2 July – Jan Anthonie Bruijn (VVD) is elected President of the Senate
 2 July – Groep Otten is formed in the Senate by former members of Forum for Democracy
 4 July – Willem Holleeder is sentenced to life in prison
 1 August – The burqa ban in schools, public transport, hospitals and government buildings voted by the States General comes into application
 10 August – Part of AFAS Stadion's roof collapses; no one is wounded
 23 August – Sybrand van Haersma Buma, who had left the office of Leader of the Christian Democratic Appeal in May, becomes Mayor of Leeuwarden
 18 September – Murder of Derk Wiersum
 30 September – Koen Schuiling (VVD) is appointed Mayor of Groningen
 1 October – Beginning of the farmers' protests
 7 October – Pauline Krikke (VVD) resigns as Mayor of the Hague
 16–20 October – Amsterdam Dance Event
 15 December – Opening of Zwolle Stadshagen railway station
 19 December – Ridouan Taghi, wanted for suspected involvement in at least ten murders (including Wiersum), is extradited from Dubai, where he was arrested three days earlier

Deaths

January
 1 January – Feis Ecktuh, Dutch rapper (b. 1986)
 2 January – Paulien van Deutekom, Dutch speed skater (b. 1981)
 18 January – Cees Haast, Dutch cyclist (b. 1938)
 22 January – Koos Andriessen, Dutch politician (b. 1928)
 23 January – Dick Dolman, Dutch politician (b. 1935)
 28 January – Jurrie Koolhof, Dutch footballer and manager (b. 1960)
 31 January – Johnny Lion, Dutch singer and actor (b. 1941)

February
 16 February – Kees Stoop, Dutch artist (b. 1929)

March
 22 March – Frans Andriessen, Dutch politician (b. 1929)

April
 23 April – Johan Witteveen, Dutch politician and economist, Deputy Prime Minister (b. 1921)

May

June
 17 June – Clemens C. J. Roothaan, Dutch chemist and physicist, developer of Roothaan equations (b. 1918)

July
 19 July – Rutger Hauer, Dutch actor, writer, and environmentalist (b. 1944)

August
 16 August – Princess Christina of the Netherlands, Princess of the Netherlands (b. 1947)

September
 18 September – Fernando Ricksen, Dutch professional footballer (b. 1976)

November
 28 November – Pim Verbeek, Dutch footballer and manager (b. 1956)

See also

 2019 European Parliament election

References

 
Netherlands
2019
Years of the 21st century in the Netherlands
Netherlands